Lucerna is a municipality in the Honduran department of Ocotepeque.

Demographics
At the time of the 2013 Honduras census, Lucerna municipality had a population of 5,861. Of these, 99.76% were Mestizo, 0.14% Indigenous, 0.05% White and 0.05% Black or Afro-Honduran.

References

Municipalities of the Ocotepeque Department